Lucero is the tenth album from Mexican pop music singer and actress Lucero. It was released on 1993 and is often cited as Veleta.

This album was the first Lucero album released only in CD and cassette, without being printed on LP. Had two formats: a digipack special edition & and the normal case with the bonus tracks, selling 350,000 copies on the former and reaching half-million status with the later. It is estimated that in total have sold over 1 million copies, certified by two gold albums and one platinum.

The first single (and most successful) was "Veleta" (Vane), and the singer once again faced the challenge to remove Luis Miguel's "America, America" from the No. 1 spot in México. She accomplished that feat. "Veleta" is also her highest peak (along with Cuentame back in 1989) at the Billboard Hot Latin Tracks charts, hitting No. 2 on 1 May 1993. It was held off from No. 1 by La Mafia's Me Estoy Enamorando.

The second single "Sobreviviré" (I Will Survive) also hit No. 1 in Mexico (and No. 8 in United States) and was dethroned from pole position by the single "Ayer" by Luis Miguel.

The album was nominated for an Eres award in the Best Album category, which was awarded to "Aries" by Luis Miguel.

All track were written and produced by Rafael Pérez Botija, including the bonus tracks written specifically for the soap opera Los Parientes Pobres.

On her second live album Lucero En Vivo Auditorio Nacional the singles "Sobreviviré", "Veleta" and "El Número Uno" are included on the set-list.

Track listing
All songs written and arranged by Rafael Pérez Botija, including the bonus tracks.

Singles

Chart performance
This was Lucero's 4th disc to enter the Billboard chart. The album stayed on the Latin Pop Albums for seven weeks, with one of them in the top ten; peaking at number 10. It stayed on the Top Latin Albums for 13 weeks, peaking at No. 19.

Personnel
 Producer, arranger and guitars: Rafael Perez Botija
 Recording engineers: J.A. Alvarez Alija, Jose Antonio Alvarez Alija, Luis Carlos Esteban and Gerardo Lopez Haro
 Mixing: Oscar Clavel
 Guitars: Javier Catala
 Backing vocals: Lucero and Doris Cale
 Music coordination: “Rubato”, Mary Jamieson and Ingrid Prysbyl
 Photography: Adolfo Pérez Butrón
 Wardrobe: Alan Simancas
 Styling: Mike Salas

References

1993 albums
Lucero (entertainer) albums